Adger is an unincorporated community in Fairfield County, in the U.S. state of South Carolina.

History
Adger was established in 1850 when the railroad was extended to that point, and was named for the Adger family of settlers. A variant name is "Adgers".

References

Unincorporated communities in South Carolina
Unincorporated communities in Fairfield County, South Carolina